was a Japanese rock band, active from 1988 until 1991.

Members
Sasano is female. All other members are male.
: Vocals
, also known as : Guitar
 also known as : Base
: Keyboard

Biography
Despite its name literally meaning "Tokyo Boys", the band was founded in 1988 by Sasano, when she was still a student of Doshisha University in Kyoto. All the lyrics were written by Sasano. She composed all the songs at first, but other members also composed later songs.
Their songs were often treated as a sort of idol style girl pop. However, the band was heavily influenced by new wave music bands, such as U2 or XTC. They released their first album on November 21, 1988. They had released 5 albums, 2 best of compilations, and 7 singles.  After the release of their final album on August 21, 1991, the band dissolved. The former members are still active in music industry.

Discography

Singles
   (January 21, 1989)
 (May 21, 1989)
 (June 21, 1990)
 (August 21, 1990)
 (November 7, 1990)
 (April 21, 1991)
 (July 21, 1991)

Albums
 (November 21, 1988)
 (June 7, 1989)
 (March 7, 1990. Mini album)
 (July 21, 1990)
 (December 16, 1990 . Best album)
 (August 21, 1991)
 (December 16, 1991. Best album)

Videos
All videos were shot by Shunji Iwai.
 (1991)
Hi no Ataru Sakamichi de (1991)
 (1991)

Tie-in songs
, used for the television advertisement of Tokyo Mode Gakuen.
Kimi no Uta ni Boku o Nosete, used for the TBS dorama Dramatic 22 theme song.
Present, used for the Fuji TV anime Ranma ½ Nettōhen closing song.
Shy Shy Japanese, used for the television advertisement of Alpen ski store.
Silent Möbius ~Sailing, used for the anime movie Silent Möbius The Motion Picture theme song.

External links
 Michiru Sasano official website
 Michiru Sasano official blog
 Tokyo Shōnen at Furinkan.com

Japanese rock music groups
Musical groups from Kyoto Prefecture